The 2017–18 Hofstra Pride women's basketball team represents Hofstra University during the 2017–18 NCAA Division I women's basketball season. The Pride, led by twelfth year head coach Krista Kilburn-Steveskey, play their home games at Hofstra Arena and were members of the Colonial Athletic Association (CAA). They finished the season 11–19, 5–13 in CAA play to finish in seventh place. They lost in the first round of the CAA women's tournament to College of Charleston.

Previous season
They finished the season 13–18, 5–13 in CAA play to finish in a 3-way tie for eighth place. They advance to the quarterfinals of the CAA women's tournament where they lost to James Madison.

Roster

Schedule

|-
!colspan=9 style=| Exhibition

|-
!colspan=9 style=| Non-conference regular season

|-
!colspan=9 style=| CAA regular season

|-
!colspan=9 style=| CAA Women's Tournament

See also
2017–18 Hofstra Pride men's basketball team

References

Hofstra Pride women's basketball seasons
Hofstra